Secamone volubilis is a species of plant in the family Apocynaceae. It is native to the islands of Réunion and Mauritius in the Indian Ocean.

References

volubilis
Flora of Réunion
Flora of Mauritius
Plants described in 1792